Euphiuche is a genus of moths of the family Erebidae. The genus was erected by Jeremy Daniel Holloway in 2008.

Species
Euphiuche picta (Moore, 1882)
Euphiuche apoblepta (Turner, 1908)

References

Hypeninae
Moth genera